Carnaíba is a city  in the state of Pernambuco, Brazil. The population in 2020, according with IBGE was 19,609 inhabitants and the total area is 427.8 km2.  Its mayor is Anchieta Patriota.

Geography

 State - Pernambuco
 Region - Sertão Pernambucano
 Boundaries - Solidão and Paraíba state   (N);  Custódia   (S);  Afogados da Ingazeira  (E);   Flores and Quixaba  (E)
 Area - 436.98 km2
 Elevation - 485 m
 Hydrography - Pajeú River
 Vegetation - Caatinga Hiperxerófila
 Climate - Semi arid- hot
 Annual average temperature - 24.4 c
 Distance to Recife - 395 km

Economy

The main economic activities in Carnaíba are based in commerce and agribusiness, especially creation of cattle, goats, sheep, pigs, chickens;  and plantations of corn, beans, manioc,  and cashew nuts.

Economic Indicators

Economy by Sector
2006

Health Indicators

References

Municipalities in Pernambuco